is a Japanese ice hockey player for Toyota Cygnus and the Japanese national team. She participated at the 2016 IIHF Women's World Championship.

Shiga competed at the 2018 Winter Olympics.

References

External links

1999 births
Living people
Ice hockey players at the 2018 Winter Olympics
Ice hockey players at the 2022 Winter Olympics
Japanese women's ice hockey defencemen
Olympic ice hockey players of Japan
Sportspeople from Hokkaido